"Dare to Dream Again" is a song written and sung by Phil Everly, which he released as a single in 1980. The song spent 16 weeks on Billboards Adult Contemporary chart, peaking at No. 9, while reaching No. 63 on the Billboard Hot Country Singles chart.

Chart performance

References

1980 songs
1980 singles
Songs written by Phil Everly
Curb Records singles